George M. Tucker (September 5, 1929 – March 1, 2013) was an American football coach.  He served as the head football at Elon University from 1960 until 1964, compiling a record of 29–20–1.  Later working as a stockbroker after his retirement from coaching, Tucker was a member of the Elon Sports Hall of Fame.

Tucker was the head football coach at Wingate University in the 1950s when the school was still a junior college.

Head coaching record

College

References

1929 births
2013 deaths
American stockbrokers
East Carolina Pirates football coaches
Elon Phoenix football coaches
Wingate Bulldogs football coaches
High school football coaches in South Carolina
Junior college football coaches in the United States
People from Monroe, North Carolina